Sudaporn Seesondee (born 4 October 1991) is a Thai boxer. She won the silver medal in the women's 60 kg event at the 2018 Asian Games held in Jakarta, Indonesia.  She won the bronze medal in the  women's lightweight event at the 2020 Summer Olympics held in Tokyo, Japan. She is the first Thai woman to win an Olympic boxing medal.

Biography
Sudaporn (nicknamed: Taew) was born into a boxing family. Her father owns a Muay Thai gym, so she practiced Muay Thai since childhood. She first started boxing with Muay Thai at the age of 11. She became a professional Muay Thai boxer and then switched to amateur boxing for many years, becoming a national team athlete when she was only 16 years old.

At the 2018 AIBA Women's World Boxing Championships held in New Delhi, India, she won the silver medal in the lightweight event.

The 2020 Summer Olympics in Tokyo, Japan were her first Summer Olympics and she lost the semi final in a close fight in a split decision 2:3 against her to Kellie Harrington in the  women's lightweight event. She then went on to win the bronze medal.

The Royal Thai Navy (RTN) has promoted her to a Sub-Lieutenant from her former position as only a volunteer in the  Royal Thai Paramilitary Force.

References

External links 
 

Living people
1991 births
Sudaporn Seesondee
Asian Games medalists in boxing
Sudaporn Seesondee
Boxers at the 2010 Asian Games
Boxers at the 2018 Asian Games
Medalists at the 2018 Asian Games
Sudaporn Seesondee
AIBA Women's World Boxing Championships medalists
Light-welterweight boxers
Lightweight boxers
Medalists at the 2020 Summer Olympics
Sudaporn Seesondee
Sudaporn Seesondee
Olympic medalists in boxing
Boxers at the 2020 Summer Olympics
Sudaporn Seesondee
Sudaporn Seesondee